Vaasa granite is a migmatitic Paleoproterozoic garnet-bearing granitoid with variable amounts of gneissose enclaves. The name refers to occurrences at Vaasa, on the west coast of Finland.

See also
Bohus granite
Jotnian
Rapakivi granite
Satakunta dyke swarms

References

Granite
Geology of Finland
Paleoproterozoic magmatism